George Bliss Nelson (May 21, 1876January 10, 1943) was an American lawyer from Portage County, Wisconsin.  He was a justice of the Wisconsin Supreme Court from 1930 through 1942.  He earlier served as district attorney of Portage County.

Biography
Nelson was born George Bliss Nelson on May 21, 1876, in Amherst, Wisconsin. He attended the University of Wisconsin–Madison and George Washington University Law School and became a member of the Order of the Coif.  After law school, he returned to Stevens Point, Wisconsin, where he was a partner for several years in the law firm Cate, Dahl, and Nelson.

Public service
Nelson was District Attorney of Portage County, Wisconsin, from 1906 to 1913. Previously, he was City Attorney of Stevens Point, Wisconsin. Additionally, he was a delegate to the 1908 Republican National Convention. Nelson was appointed to the Supreme Court by Governor Walter J. Kohler, Sr., in 1930. He was elected to a full term on the court in 1935, and served until 1942, when his health began to fail.  He sent his formal resignation to the Governor in December 1942, and died a month later, on January 10, 1943.

Personal life and family
Nelson was deeply religious and active in the Episcopal Church.  He married Ruth Weller in 1912.  Ruth was a daughter of the Episcopal bishop Reginald Heber Weller.  George and Ruth Nelson had four children.

References

1876 births
1943 deaths
People from Amherst, Wisconsin
People from Stevens Point, Wisconsin
Justices of the Wisconsin Supreme Court
Wisconsin Republicans
District attorneys in Wisconsin
University of Wisconsin–Madison alumni
George Washington University Law School alumni